Captain John Glegg was a soldier in the 49th Regiment of Foot of the British Army. He served with General Isaac Brock as one of two aides-de-camp during the War of 1812. He was in charge of funeral arrangements for Brock, who died at the Battle of Queenston Heights.

References
 The legend of Isaac Brock

Year of birth missing
Year of death missing
Glegg, John B.
British Army personnel of the War of 1812
British people of the War of 1812
British military personnel of the War of 1812